Lin Zi-miao (born 28 January 1952) is a Taiwanese politician. She is the Magistrate of Yilan County since 25 December 2018.

Political career
Lin was mayor of her home township Luodong until 2018.

2018 Yilan County magistrate election
She began campaigning for the Yilan County Magistracy in early 2018, and won stronger local support compared to her opponent, Chen Ou-po.

Lin defeated Chen in local elections held on 24 November 2018.

Controversy
On 13 January 2022, Lin was one of several Yilan government officials questioned during an investigation into suspected corruption. Prosecutors clarified the next day that several cases were being investigated, and that Lin had been released without bail after the questioning concluded. A second round of questioning took place on 22 February 2022, focusing on value-added tax exemptions for a Luodong Township property granted in 2019, and subsequent revisions to the township’s urban development plans. Investigators later stated that they had tracked nearly NT$100 million in transfers, dating to the early 2000s, to Lin and her relatives from Yang Chi-hsiung. In August 2022, the Yilan County Prosecutors’ Office charged Lin, her daughter, and several others with corruption.

References

External links

 

1952 births
Living people
Kuomintang politicians in Taiwan
Magistrates of Yilan County, Taiwan
People from Luodong, Yilan County, Taiwan
Women mayors of places in Taiwan
21st-century Taiwanese women politicians
21st-century Taiwanese politicians